Megan Catherine Hunt (born May 9, 1986) is an American entrepreneur and politician serving as a member of the Nebraska Legislature. A member of the Democratic Party, Hunt represents the 8th legislative district in Omaha, consisting of the midtown neighborhoods of Dundee, Benson, and Keystone. She succeeded term-limited Nebraska State Senator Burke Haar. She identifies as bisexual, and was the first openly LGBT person elected to the state legislature of Nebraska, as well as the first woman to represent the 8th district.

Hunt was strongly critical of former President Donald Trump and his role in the incitement of the 2021 storming of the United States Capitol.
Hunt has been critical of Nebraska Governor Pete Ricketts for not wearing a mask while gathered close to others during the COVID-19 pandemic, his administration's response to the pandemic, and Ricketts's choices and actions surrounding a 2020 contract with an out of state company for the provision of COVID-19 testing kits. Hunt also introduced an amendment to let Douglas County, Nebraska, impose a local mask mandate, but later withdrew it.

Early life and education 
Hunt is originally from Blair, Nebraska, but eventually moved to Omaha, Nebraska.

Hunt graduated from Blair High School in Blair, Nebraska, in 2004. Hunt earned a Bachelors of Arts in Intercultural communication and German from Dana College in Blair in 2008.

Hunt has received Shout Magazine's 30 under 30 award. She was also recognized by the Midlands Business Journal in 2011 as a member of their 40 under 40 class, and was also one of Omaha Jaycees' Ten Outstanding Omahans in 2016.

Career 
Hunt previously owned a boutique clothing store called Hello Holiday. She also founded Safe Space Nebraska, a nonprofit organization that protects bar patrons from harassment.

Political career 
Hunt has also been a trustee of the Business Ethics Alliance since 2014 and has been a member of Friends of Planned Parenthood since 2015. In 2019, she completed Harvard University's John F. Kennedy School of Government program for Senior Executives in State and Local Government as a David Bohnett LGBTQ Victory Institute Leadership Fellow.

Nebraska State Legislature 
Hunt serves on the Business and Labor Committee, the Committee on Committees, the Government Committee, the Military and Veteran Affairs Committee, the Urban Affairs Committee, and the State-Tribal Relations Committee. She has sponsored sixty-eight bills during her legislative tenure.

Hunt was one of eleven Nebraska state senators who attempted to call a legislative special session for racial and social justice issues in Nebraska.

Political positions and bills introduced

Abortion 
Hunt opposes restrictions to access to abortion. In 2019, she opposed legislation that would legalize abortion pill reversal, where healthcare providers could provide information about drugs that can reverse medication-based abortions. In 2020, Hunt opposed legislation that would have made dismemberment abortions in the second trimester illegal. In 2021, she introduced legislation to repeal the state's ban on telemedicine consultations about medication-based abortion.

Birth control for survivors of sexual assault 
Hunt has supported legislation which would require hospitals to inform sexual assault survivors about emergency birth control and make it available to them; the legislation has not yet passed as of January 2023.

Climate change 
Hunt supported legislation which would conduct a study on the effects of climate change in Nebraska, during the 2020 legislative session.

Education 
Hunt has indicated support for making a community college education more affordable for Nebraska students.

Food stamps 
Hunt was previously critical of Nebraska's decision not to re-apply for emergency SNAP benefits during the height of the COVID-19 Pandemic. She also introduced Legislative Bill 121 which would allow those with felony drug convictions to qualify for food stamps.

LGBTQ rights 
Hunt generally supports employment protection laws for LGBT people in the workplace.

Prison reform and drug laws 
Hunt has stated that Nebraskan prisons should focus more so on rehabilitation. She is in favor of legalizing recreational marijuana and allowing those with previous convictions to have their records expunged. Hunt also believes that investments in early education are required to help reduce the so-called school-to-prison pipeline.

Voter ID laws 
Hunt has been critical of voter ID laws and stated that there is no voter fraud in Nebraska.

Electoral history

Personal life 
Hunt is currently a single mother to a son named Ash. She is an atheist.

References

External links

1986 births
Democratic Party Nebraska state senators
Living people
21st-century American politicians
21st-century American women politicians
Women state legislators in Nebraska
LGBT state legislators in Nebraska
Bisexual politicians
Bisexual women
Politicians from Omaha, Nebraska
People from Washington County, Nebraska
People from Blair, Nebraska
Dana College alumni
American atheists
21st-century American businesswomen
21st-century American businesspeople